Xylophagus nitidus is a species of fly in the family Xylophagidae.

Distribution
Canada, United States.

References

Xylophagidae
Insects described in 1904
Diptera of North America